Bryan Henderson (born April 11, 1977) is a former American football defensive lineman who played six seasons in the Arena Football League (AFL) with the Arizona Rattlers, Austin Wranglers, Utah Blaze, Kansas City Brigade, Grand Rapids Rampage and Columbus Destroyers. He first enrolled at Los Angeles Valley College before transferring to Northwestern Oklahoma State University.

College career
Henderson first played college football for the Los Angeles Valley College Monarchs, earning First Team Juco All-America honors in 1999. He transferred to play for the Northwestern Oklahoma State Rangers, earning First Team All-Conference recognition in 2000.

Professional career
Henderson signed with the Arizona Rattlers of the AFL on December 5, 2002 and played for the team from 2003 to 2004. He garnered First Team All-Arena recognition in 2004 and All-Rookie Team honors in 2003. He was signed by the AFL's Austin Wranglers on October 26, 2004 and played for the team during the 2005 season. Henderson was traded to the Utah Blaze for Delbert Cowsette on October 5, 2005 and played for the team during the 2006 season. He was traded to the Kansas City Brigade for Aaron Hamilton and Matt Walls on March 22, 2006. He was released by the team on January 29, 2007. Henderson signed with the Grand Rapids Rampage of the AFL on March 29, 2007 and played for the team during the 2007 season. He was signed by the Columbus Destroyers of the AFL on April 29, 2008. He was released by the Destroyers on May 22, 2008.

References

External links
Just Sports Stats

1977 births
African-American players of American football
American football defensive ends
Arizona Rattlers players
Austin Wranglers players
Columbus Destroyers players
Grand Rapids Rampage players
Kansas City Brigade players
Living people
Los Angeles Valley Monarchs football players
Players of American football from Cincinnati
Northwestern Oklahoma State Rangers football players
Utah Blaze players
21st-century African-American sportspeople
20th-century African-American sportspeople